Rodrigo Leonel Depetris (born 5 May 1990) is an Argentine professional footballer who plays as a forward for Nuova Florida Calcio.

Career
Depetris spent the opening six years of his senior career with Atlético de Rafaela. After making three appearances for the club in two Primera B Nacional seasons, Depetris made his Argentine Primera División debut on 1 October 2011 versus Lanús. In February 2013, Depetris netted his career first goal during a Copa Argentina tie with Alvarado. He subsequently scored nine times in the next three seasons. On 9 September 2015, Olympiacos Volos of the Greek Football League signed Depetris. He scored five goals, the first against Acharnaikos on 19 October, in fourteen fixtures for Olympiacos Volos during 2015–16.

He returned to Argentina in 2016 to play for Argentine Primera División side Sarmiento. Just over a year later, fellow Primera División side Tigre became Depetris' fourth career club. He made six appearances for Tigre to end 2017, prior to securing a contract to rejoin Atlético de Rafaela in January 2018. Nine months later, in September, Depetris joined Alvarado of Torneo Federal A.

Personal life
Rodrigo's brother, David, is also a footballer.

Career statistics
.

References

External links

1990 births
Living people
Sportspeople from Santa Fe Province
Argentine footballers
Association football forwards
Argentine expatriate footballers
Primera Nacional players
Argentine Primera División players
Serie D players
Football League (Greece) players
Atlético de Rafaela footballers
Olympiacos Volos F.C. players
Club Atlético Sarmiento footballers
Club Atlético Tigre footballers
Club Atlético Alvarado players
Guillermo Brown footballers
San Telmo footballers
Expatriate footballers in Greece
Expatriate footballers in Italy
Argentine expatriate sportspeople in Greece
Argentine expatriate sportspeople in Italy